The 2018 Toledo Rockets football team represented the University of Toledo in the 2018 NCAA Division I FBS football season. They were led by third-year head coach Jason Candle and played their home games at the Glass Bowl as members of the West Division of the Mid-American Conference. They finished the season 7–6, 5–3 in MAC play to finish in a three-way tie for second place in the West Division. They were invited to the Bahamas Bowl where they lost to FIU.

Previous season
The Rockets finished the 2017 season 11–3, 7–1 in MAC play to win the West Division. They defeated Akron in the MAC Championship game to become champions of the MAC. They received an invitation to the Dollar General Bowl where they lost to Appalachian State for the second consecutive year in a bowl game.

Preseason

Award watch lists
Listed in the order that they were released

Preseason media poll
The MAC released their preseason media poll on July 24, 2018, with the Rockets predicted to finish in second place in the West Division.

Schedule

Source:

Game summaries

VMI

Miami (FL)

Nevada

at Fresno State

Bowling Green

at Eastern Michigan

Buffalo

at Western Michigan

Ball State

at Northern Illinois

at Kent State

Central Michigan

vs. FIU (Bahamas Bowl)

Players drafted into the NFL

References

Toledo
Toledo Rockets football seasons
Toledo Rockets football